Jatindra Nath Pramanick was an Indian politician. He was elected to the Lok Sabha, lower house of the Parliament of India from Balurghat, West Bengal as a member of the Indian National Congress.

References

External links
Official Biographical Sketch in Lok Sabha Website

Indian National Congress politicians from West Bengal
India MPs 1967–1970
Lok Sabha members from West Bengal
1907 births
Year of death missing